Eugene Francis Layden (March 14, 1894 – December 12, 1984) was a Major League Baseball outfielder. In three career games, he had two hits in seven at-bats, with two RBIs. He batted and threw left-handed.

Layden was born and died in Pittsburgh, Pennsylvania.

External links
Baseball Reference.com page

1894 births
1984 deaths
New York Yankees players
Major League Baseball outfielders
Baseball players from Pittsburgh
Jersey City Skeeters players
Mobile Sea Gulls players
San Antonio Bronchos players
Binghamton Triplets players
Manistee Champs players